Heliotrope most often refers to:
 Heliotrope (color), a pink-purple color, named for the color of the flowering plants
 Heliotropium,  a genus of flowering plants

Heliotrope may also refer to:

Natural science
 Heliotrope (mineral), a variety of jasper or chalcedony
 Heliotropism, plants' diurnal motion in response to the sun's movement

Art, media and entertainment
 Heliotrope, a story collection by Justina Robson
 Heliotropes (band), a Brooklyn-based band
 "Heliotrope" (song), by At the Drive-In
 "Heliotrope", a song by Robyn Hitchcock on the album Moss Elixir
 Heliotrope Studios, a video game developer
 Heliotrope (film), a lost 1920 American silent drama film
 Miss Heliotrope, the governess in Elizabeth Goudge's children's book, The Little White Horse

Other uses
 Heliotrope,  a distinctive rash associated with dermatomyositis, including juvenile dermatomyositis
 Heliotrope (instrument), in surveying, a long distance survey target based on mirror-reflected sunlight
 Heliotrope (building), a rotating home built by Rolf Disch
 HMS Heliotrope